Mount Santo Tomas is a potentially active stratovolcano in the Philippines located in the municipality of Tuba in the province of Benguet. The mountain is part of the protected Santo Tomas Forest Reserve declared through Proclamation No. 581 signed by President Manuel L. Quezon on July 9, 1940.

On May 5, 2015, a Permanent Environmental Protection Order was issued by the Court of Appeals with the Writ of Kalikasan and Writ of Continuing Mandamus.

Due to its high elevation, several communications and broadcasting companies constructed relay stations at the summit.

Physical features
Mount Santo Tomas is a stratovolcano with numerous volcanic vents and fissures.

Listings
Philippine Institute of Volcanology and Seismology (PHIVOLCS) lists Mount Santo Tomas as potentially active volcano.

The Global Volcanism Program is uncertain about the last activity of Mount Santo Tomas.

Eruptions

The last eruption was recorded on January 4, 1641, together with Mt. Parker of Southern Mindanao.

Geology
Rock type is not reported.

Mount Santo Tomas is close to the auriferous volcanic placements near Baguio, and beside the fault line which occasioned the July 16, 1990, earthquake devastating much of Luzon, and especially Baguio.

See also
List of active volcanoes in the Philippines
List of potentially active volcanoes in the Philippines
List of inactive volcanoes in the Philippines
Philippine Institute of Volcanology and Seismology

References

Subduction volcanoes
Volcanoes of Luzon
Mountains of the Philippines
Potentially active volcanoes of the Philippines
Landforms of Benguet
Stratovolcanoes of the Philippines
Pleistocene stratovolcanoes